The 2002 World Senior Curling Championships were held from April 7 to 12 at the Civic Arena and Bismarck Curling Rink in Bismarck, North Dakota, United States.

The tournament was partly held conjunction with 2002 World Men's Curling Championship and 2002 World Women's Curling Championship.

Men

Teams

Round robin

  Teams to playoffs
  Teams to tiebreaker

Tiebreaker

Playoffs
Final

Final standings

Women

Teams

Round robin

  Teams to playoffs
  Teams to tiebreaker

Tiebreaker

Playoffs
Final

Final standings

References

External links

World Senior Curling Championships
World Senior Curling Championships
World Senior Curling Championships
International curling competitions hosted by the United States
World Senior Curling Championships
Curling competitions in Bismarck, North Dakota